The 2011–12 AHL season was the 76th season of the American Hockey League. The regular season began on October 7, 2011, and concluded on April 15, 2012. The 2012 Calder Cup playoffs follows the conclusion of the regular season.

Regular season
The 2011–12 season will feature scheduling changes in the regular season and post season. The major change will be the elimination of four games and extending the season by a week. The reasoning behind the change is to eliminate teams having to play four games in five nights. This will bring the total number of games for each team to 76. To accomplish that, the league has decided to add an additional week to the season.

On July 5, 2011, the league's new realignment was revealed. The league moved from having four divisions of seven/eight teams to six even divisions of five teams, similar to that of the NHL. The Western Conference consists of the West, Midwest, and North divisions; the Eastern Conference consists of the Atlantic, Northeast, and East divisions. As a result of the Manitoba Moose relocating to St. John's, they have switched to the Eastern Conference, while the Charlotte Checkers have moved to the Western Conference.

The third installment of the AHL Outdoor Classic took place in Canada, with the Hamilton Bulldogs hosting the Toronto Marlies in a regional rivalry game at Ivor Wynne Stadium on January 21. The Marlies won the game 7–2 in front of a crowd of 20,565 spectators. This marks the first time the event has been played in Canada, and the event was moved up to the third weekend in January, instead of the third weekend in February as it has been in previous years. In addition to this game, another outdoor AHL game, between the Hershey Bears and the Adirondack Phantoms, took place as part of the 2012 NHL Winter Classic festivities on January 6, 2012. The Phantoms won that game 4–3 in overtime, and an AHL attendance record was set as the game drew a crowd of 45,653 fans.

The Norfolk Admirals set a professional hockey record with 28 consecutive wins.

Playoff format
The 2011–12 playoff format will change as a result of the scheduling changes. The first round of the playoffs will now be a best of five series and the following rounds will continue to be best of seven game series'.

Eight teams per conference will qualify for the playoffs. The three division winners will earn the top three seeds. Seeds four through eight will be determined by regular season points out of the remaining teams in the division. Team will be re-seeded after the first round so that the highest remaining seed plays the lowest remaining seed.

Team and NHL affiliation changes

Team changes
The Manitoba Moose relocated to St. John's, Newfoundland and Labrador, due to the Atlanta Thrashers of the NHL relocating to Winnipeg, Manitoba, as the Winnipeg Jets. They became the St. John's IceCaps, affiliating as the Jets' farm club.

Affiliation changes

Standings 
 indicates team has clinched division and a playoff spot
 indicates team has clinched a playoff spot
 indicates team has been eliminated from playoff contention

Eastern Conference

Western Conference

Statistical leaders

Leading skaters 

The following players are sorted by points, then goals.

GP = Games played; G = Goals; A = Assists; Pts = Points; +/– = Plus-minus; PIM = Penalty minutes

Leading goaltenders 

The following goaltenders with a minimum 1500 minutes played led the league in goals against average.

GP = Games played; TOI = Time on ice (in minutes); SA = Shots against; GA = Goals against; SO = Shutouts; GAA = Goals against average; SV% = Save percentage; W = Wins; L = Losses; OT = Overtime/shootout loss

Calder Cup playoffs

AHL awards

Milestones
 On December 10, 2011, Chicago Wolves forward Darren Haydar recorded his 700th career AHL point. He became the 22nd player in league history to reach this milestone.
 On February 11, 2012, Worcester Sharks coach Roy Sommer recorded his 500th win as an AHL coach. He became the fourth coach in league history to reach this milestone.
 On March 18, 2012, the Norfolk Admirals broke the single-season consecutive wins record at 18, finishing the streak with 28 consecutive wins at the close of the season, the longest such streak in professional hockey worldwide. The previous record was set by the Philadelphia Phantoms in 2004–05.
 On March 25, 2012, Springfield Falcons forward Alexandre Giroux recorded his 700th career AHL point. He became the 23rd player in league history to reach this milestone.

See also
List of AHL seasons
2011 in ice hockey
2012 in ice hockey

References

External links
AHL official site

 
2011-12 Ahl Season
2
2